The Ulster Cup was a knock-out cricket competition in Ireland run jointly by the Northern Cricket Union and the North West Cricket Union. The top eight teams in the previous season's NCU Premier League and North West Senior League 1 were eligible to take part.

Matches are of 40 overs duration, but may be reduced to ten overs where delays or interruptions necessitate.

Waringstown are the current holders after they won the trophy for the first time beating Bready in the 2017 final

Brigade and Instonians are the most successful clubs in the competition with 4 wins each

The competition was discontinued after the 2017 season, and from 2021 the Ulster Cup will be played for between the winners of the NCU and NWCU T20 Cup competitions.

List of finals

Summary of winners

Summary of winners by province

See also
Irish Senior Cup
NCU Senior League
North West Senior League

References
Cricket Ireland Archives

Irish domestic cricket competitions
Cricket in Ulster